Nicolás Quagliata Platero (born 5 June 1999) is a Uruguayan professional footballer who plays for Brazilian club Cuiabá, on loan from Greek club PAOK. Mainly an attacking midfielder, he can also play as a left winger.

Career

Early career
Quagliata was one of the youngest players at Defensor and between the ages of 12 and 13, following the prescription of an endocrinologist, he underwent growth hormone treatment, the same procedure as Lionel Messi had gone through when he was in training at Newell's Old Boys and one of the reasons why he emigrated to Barcelona.

Montevideo Wanderers
Quagliata graduated from Montevideo Wanderers B, and made his debut on 12 May 2019 in a match against C.A. Cerro, for the year's Primera División.
In 2020, the bohemian DT became Mauricio Larriera who did not call him for the first three games of the Apertura after which the tournament was paralyzed for five months due to the coronavirus pandemic. In August, when football returned, he entered the team's rotation, although Larriera's cycle ended with the Apertura. Since Intermediate 2021, Wanderers is directed by Daniel Carreño.
His name sounded like a possible reinforcement of Nacional, where his father is a technical assistant, and in Peñarol, where Larriera knows him first-hand.

Since Carreño directs Wanderers, the team has been a finalist in Intermedio 2020 (lost on penalties in January 2021 against Nacional), was ninth in Clausura 2020, 11th in Apertura 2021 and third in Clausura 2021. has reached the regularity necessary to fight for a short tournament. Hand in hand with the talent of Quagliata, he will try it in this Apertura 2022.
As a right-handed midfielder who plays on the left, Quagliata admires and looks up to Philippe Coutinho and Giorgian De Arrascaeta a lot.

PAOK
Οn 3 June 2022, Quagliata signed a four-year contract with Greek club PAOK.

Career statistics

References

External links
 

1999 births
Living people
Footballers from Montevideo
Association football midfielders
Uruguayan footballers
Montevideo Wanderers F.C. players
PAOK FC players
Uruguayan Primera División players
Super League Greece players
Cuiabá Esporte Clube players
Uruguayan expatriate footballers
Uruguayan expatriate sportspeople in Greece
Uruguayan expatriate sportspeople in Brazil
Expatriate footballers in Greece
Expatriate footballers in Brazil